The Lady in the Car with Glasses and a Gun is a 1970 psychological thriller film directed by Anatole Litvak starring Samantha Eggar, Oliver Reed and John McEnery. It is based on the 1966 novel of the same name by Sébastien Japrisot. This was Litvak's final film. The film was remade in 2015.

Plot
Just before the Bastille Day holiday weekend, English secretary Danielle "Dany" Lang types up a document for her advertising agency boss, Michael Caldwell, to take on a business trip to Geneva. On the way to drop off her boss and his wife, Anita, her former roommate, at the airport, her boss gives her an envelope with her pay in it.

After dropping them off Dany impulsively decides to drive to the Riviera for the weekend. When Dany pulls into a small café the owner tries to return a coat to her, she claims she left there the day before. At a petrol station Dany is attacked in the toilet and injures her hand. She is bemused as various strangers claim to know her.

Heading further south she picks up a hitchhiker, Philippe and the pair spend the night together. The following day Philippe steals Dany's car prior to reaching the coast. She later finds Philippe in Marseilles where they find a man's body and a gun in the trunk of the car.

After Philippe disappears again, Dany visits the home of the dead man in Avignon and oddly finds both some of her clothes and also nude pictures of herself. Returning to the café to reclaim the coat she finds a copy of her pay envelope in one of the coat's pockets. Dany is now completely perplexed by the situation and returns to the dead man's home where her boss, Michael, is waiting for her. He tells Dany that the dead man was one of Anita's lovers, whom she murdered at his home. To frame Dany, they planted evidence and set up various incidents to establish her guilt: the attack in the toilet was committed by Michael, who injured her hand so Anita could wear a bandage and be mistaken for the secretary; and the nude photos had been taken by Anita when they were roommates.

When Michael tells Dany he plans to murder her and make it look like a suicide she tells him he won't succeed as she has already sent both pay envelopes to the police.

Cast

Samantha Eggar as Danielle "Dany" Lang
Oliver Reed as Michael Caldwell
John McEnery as Yves-Marie aka Philippe
Stéphane Audran as Anita Caldwell
Billie Dixon as Tall girl
Bernard Fresson as Jean Yvain
Marcel Bozzuffi as Manuel
Philippe Nicaud as Highway policeman

Production
The film was shot at Studios de Boulogne and on location in Paris, Avignon, Chalon-sur-Saône, Marseille, Moret-sur-Loing, and Remoulins.

Soundtrack
The film's score was written by Michel Legrand and the title music was On the Road sung by Petula Clark.

Track listing:

 1. "Je Roule" sung in French by Petula Clark
 2. "Auxerre"
 3. "Mi, Sol, Mi, Mi, Re, Re, Mi (Avallon)"
 4. "Auberge-Inn A Saulieu"
 5. "Chalon-Sur-Blues"
 6. "Macon-Sur-Marche"
 7. "Jerk-Les-Avignons"
 8. "Le Pont Du Gard"

 9. "On the Road" sung in English by Petula Clark
10. "14 Juillet 70 "
11. "Un Coeur, Deux Piques"
12. "Guatemalteque"
13. "O-No-Ma-To-Pe"
14. "La Dame Dan L'Auto - Generique"
15. "Les Lunettes"
16. "Le Fusil"

Reception
Roger Greenspun in his New York Times review said that "in relation to better works in its genre, the film looks rather like an example of the decline of craftsmanship — effective, well-colored, but uncertain in line and construction." At the same time, he praised Samantha Eggar's performance, saying "she is in herself sufficient justification for the movie." Time Out remarked that "the tortuous mystifications and ponderings...wear out their welcome long before the final gush of explanations." Time Magazine called it "one of those carefully jumbled jigsaw puzzles and comes complete with a rushed, not totally satisfactory explanation at the end." New York Magazine said "the Japrisot thriller has become an incoherent mystery with antiquely heavy handed performances by Oliver Reed, John McEnery and Samantha Eggar."

References

External links

1970s English-language films
1970 films
1970s psychological thriller films
American psychological thriller films
French psychological thriller films
Films directed by Anatole Litvak
Films scored by Michel Legrand
Columbia Pictures films
Films based on French novels
English-language French films
Films based on works by Sébastien Japrisot
1970s American films
1970s French films